Heterosquilla is a genus of shrimps belonging to the family Tetrasquillidae.

The species of this genus are found in Southern America, Southeastern Asia and New Zealand.

Species:

Heterosquilla armata
Heterosquilla koning 
Heterosquilla laevis 
Heterosquilla pentadactyla 
Heterosquilla platensis 
Heterosquilla polydactyla 
Heterosquilla tricarinata 
Heterosquilla tridentata 
Heterosquilla trifida

References

Stomatopoda